Dourados Atlético Clube, commonly referred to as Dourados, is a Brazilian professional football club based in Dourados, Mato Grosso do Sul founded on 20 December 2020.

Stadium
Dourados play their home games at Douradão. The stadium has a maximum capacity of 30,000 people.

Honours
 Campeonato Sul-Mato-Grossense Second Division
 Winners (1): 2020

References

External links
 Dourados on Facebook
 Dourados on Globo Esporte

Association football clubs established in 2020
2020 establishments in Brazil